DVW may refer to:

 Deutscher Verlag der Wissenschaften, a former East-German publishing house for scientific literature
 Dee Valley Water, a British water company
 Designing Virtual Worlds, a 2003 book about video games